"A Map of Middle-earth" is the name of two colour posters by different artists, Barbara Remington and Pauline Baynes. They depict the north-western region of the fictional continent of Middle-earth. They were published in 1965 and 1970 by the American and British publishers of J. R. R. Tolkien's book The Lord of the Rings. The poster map by Pauline Baynes has been described as "iconic".

Origins 

All maps of Middle-earth derive ultimately from  J. R. R. Tolkien's own working maps, which he constantly annotated over the years, whether in English or in Elvish. He was unable to find the time to bring them into a presentable state in time for the publication of The Lord of the Rings. The task was delegated to his son Christopher. Neither of the maps cover the whole continent of Middle-earth; instead they portray the north-western region at the end of the Third Age, where the story of The Lord of the Rings takes place.

Jonathan Crowe, writing on TOR.com, describes Christopher Tolkien's cartography as hugely influential on fantasy literature, setting the norm for "epic fantasy novels" which "were supposed to come with maps".

Barbara Remington 

The earlier poster, signed "BRem" (Barbara Remington), was published in 1965 by Ballantine Books and features border images adapted from Remington's cover designs for the 1965 Ballantine paperback edition of The Lord of the Rings.

Pauline Baynes 

The second version, by Pauline Baynes, was published in 1970 by George Allen & Unwin in the UK and Ballantine Books in the USA. It features ten small inset illustrations of important locations from the story. The poster is framed at the top by a row of nine figures representing the members of the "Fellowship of the Ring" setting out on their quest. At the bottom is an array of antagonists from the novel, including the nine Black Riders, Gollum, Shelob, and various Orcs. The poster has become iconic. Tolkien approved of Baynes's illustrations of his books, and was pleased with at least some of her vignettes on the poster map. 

Baynes's poster map helped to make the capital letter-only Uncial script the standard for Middle-earth maps.

References

Sources

External links 

 Map of Middle-earth, showing the movements of characters from both The Lord of the Rings and The Hobbit film series by Peter Jackson
 In the Beginning was the Word: How Medieval Text Became Fantasy Maps tracing the roots of Tolkien's mapping influences to medieval prefatory textual practices.

Posters
Fictional maps
 
Ballantine Books books